3D Bomb Alley is a video game created by Software Invasion for the BBC Micro and Acorn Electron.  According to The Micro User magazine, the gameplay is "based on San Carlos Bay in the Falklands" and refers to the  Falklands War, in particular the Battle of San Carlos when San Carlos Water became known as "Bomb Alley".

Gameplay
A static background is displayed of a sea inlet, looking out to sea with hills on either side, on which the player's ships and enemy aircraft are superimposed.  The player controls an anti-aircraft cannon, located at his or her point of view, with a crosshair on the screen. The graphics work with 3D glasses creating the appearance of depth.

Aircraft approach in perspective, starting as dots in the distance and increasing in apparent size and speed until they pass overhead or are shot down.  Each aircraft allowed to reach the inlet drops a bomb into the water, destroying one of the ships.  The player starts with three vessels and gains another for every ten aircraft hit.  Their turn ends when the last remaining ship is bombed.  The number of aircraft approaching at once is proportional to the size of the fleet in the inlet.

References

1984 video games
BBC Micro and Acorn Electron games
BBC Micro and Acorn Electron-only games
Shooter video games
Video games developed in the United Kingdom